The Winterhilfswerk des Deutschen Volkes, commonly known by its abbreviated form Winterhilfswerk (WHW), was an annual donation drive by the National Socialist People's Welfare to help finance charitable work. Initially an emergency measure to support people during the Great Depression, it went on to become a major source of funding for the activities of the NSV and a major component of Germany's welfare state. Donations to the WHW, which were voluntary in name but de facto required of German citizens, supplanted tax-funded welfare institutions and freed up money for rearmament. Furthermore, it had the propagandistic role of publicly staging the solidarity of the Volksgemeinschaft.

Background and early history 
The Winterhilfswerk was organised by the National Socialist People's Welfare, a social welfare organisation whose declared purpose was "to develop and promote the living, healthy forces of the German people". The NSV's origins can be traced to Nazi party welfare activities during the Kampfzeit, when local groups were formed to provide aid to party members in distress. The Berlin association "Nationalsozialistische Volkswohlfahrt e.V." is considered the primary institutional ancestor of the NSV. Initially, the Berlin organisation was met with contempt by Nazi Party leaders: In 1932 the party informed the association's leadership that it had initiated legal proceedings because of "misuse of the word 'national socialist'". In 1933, the party changed its position; Hitler designated the NSV a party organ on 3 May 1933. It went on to grow rapidly, counting 3.7 million members in 1934 and becoming the second largest mass organisation in Nazi Germany, behind the German Labour Front. At the onset of the Second World War, it had more than 10 million members.

Hitler ordered the establishment of the Winterhilfswerk in 1933 and personally opened the first drive, giving out the directive "no one shall be hungry, no one shall freeze". The initial donation drive in winter 1933/1934 took place against a backdrop of acute distress in large parts of the German populace; its initiation was partly a result of the party's desire to prevent social unrest. The "Law on the Winterhilfswerk of the German People", passed on 1 December 1936, formally established the WHW as a registered association, to be led by the Reich Minister of Public Enlightenment and Propaganda.

Operation 

The yearly donation drives by the Winterhilfswerk constituted the most visible part of the NSV's work. As part of the centralisation of Nazi Germany, posters urged people to donate, rather than give directly to beggars. The Hitlerjugend and Bund Deutscher Mädel (boys' and girls' associations, respectively) were extremely active in collecting for this charity. As part of the effort to place the community over the individual, totals were not reported for any individuals, only what the branch raised.

Certain weekends were assigned to all of the different Nazi associations, each with their own special Abzeichen, or badges, to pass out in exchange for a pfennig or two. The highly collectible items were made of many different materials, such as wood, glass, paper, terra cotta, metal and plastic. Over 8,000 different pieces had been produced by the end of the war, and some of the rarer ones sell for quite a lot of money today.

The Can Rattlers, as they became known, were relentless in their pursuit of making sure every good German citizen gave their share to the WHW. In fact, those who forgot to give had their names put in the paper to remind them of their neglect. Neighbors and even family members were encouraged to whisper the names of shirkers to their block leaders so that they could persuade them to do their duty. On one occasion, a civil servant was prosecuted for failure to donate, and his argument that it was voluntary was dismissed on the grounds it was an extreme view of liberty to neglect all duties that were not actually prescribed by law and therefore an abuse of liberty. It was not unheard of for workers to lose their jobs for not donating to Winterhilfe or not giving enough. For instance, when a worker was fired for not donating to Winterhilfe, the firing was upheld by a labour court on the grounds that it was "conduct hostile to the community of the people [...] to be most strongly condemned".

Large donations were also a means to establish oneself as a loyal supporter of the Nazi Party without the commitment of joining it.

A greatly encouraged practice was once a month to have a one-pot meal (eintopf), reducing all the food to one course and the money thus saved was to be donated. During autumn and winter months from 1933 onward, the Eintopfsonntag (One-Pot Sunday or Stew Sunday) was officially scheduled by the WHW. Restaurants were required to offer an eintopf meal at one of several price points. Households were reminded of the occasion, although it has been noted that the authorities did not investigate whether the one-pot meal was actually served.

Collection drives were a mainstay of the Winter Relief and those who did not give, or gave little (such as one pair of boots to a clothing drive), were sometimes the victims of mob violence and needed to be protected by the police , known in French as the Secours d'Hiver in Belgium.

Gifts and tokens 
A paper Monatstürplakette (monthly placard) was issued to place on one's door or in one's window to show others that one had given and also to keep the roaming bands of charity workers at bay.

Donors were often given small souvenir gratitude gifts of negligible value, somewhat similar to the way modern charities mail out address labels and holiday cards. A typical such gift was a very small propaganda booklet, reminiscent of Victorian-era miniature books; about 0.8" wide x 1.5" tall. Booklets included The Führer Makes History, a collection of Hitler photographs, and Gerhard Koeppen and other decorated heroes of the war.

More generous donors would receive concomitantly better gifts, such as lapel pins on a wide variety of themes. Some depicting occupational types or geographic areas of the Reich, others animals, birds and insects, nursery rhyme and fairy tale characters, or notable persons from German history (including Hitler himself). They were made from a variety of materials. Each individual miniature book, badge, badge set or toy set was only available for two or three days of a particular collection drive. The populace would be encouraged to donate the following week and thereby collect the latest in the series. There could also be consequences such as nagging by the appropriate official if your local Blockleiter saw that you were not wearing the current, appropriate pin by about Tuesday of the week.

When he visited Germany in 1939 as a reporter for the North American Newspaper Alliance, Lothrop Stoddard wrote

Once a fortnight, every city, town, and village in the Reich seethes with brown-shirted Storm Troopers carrying red-painted canisters. These are the Winter-Help collection-boxes. The Brown-Shirts go everywhere. You cannot sit in a restaurant or beer-hall but what, sooner or later, a pair of them will work through the place, rattling their canisters ostentatiously in the faces of customers. And I never saw a German formally refuse to drop in his mite, even though the contribution might have been less than the equivalent of one American cent.
During these periodic money-raising campaigns, all sorts of dodges are employed. On busy street-corners comedians, singers, musicians, sailors, gather a crowd by some amusing skit, at the close of which the Brown-Shirts collect. People buy tiny badges to show they have contributed—badges good only for that particular campaign. One time they may be an artificial flower; next time a miniature dagger, and so forth. The Winter-Help campaign series reaches its climax shortly before Christmas in the so-called Day of National Solidarity. On that notable occasion the Big Guns of the Nazi Party sally forth with their collection-boxes to do their bit.

Stoddard described visits to a Winterhilfswerk facility where he was shown winter clothing and other items meant for distribution. Few others describe the charitable work of the WHW and the historical record contains many details on the collection of money and goods, but little about what was done with either. William Russell's eyewitness book Berlin Embassy surmises that the entire program was a sham and that all proceeds were used to produce armaments. The 1933–1945 collection drives issued a large number of themed ceramic medallions and other badges given to donators.

Notes

References

Bibliography

External links 

 

Social welfare charities
Nazi Party organizations